Joe "The Quiet Man" Comeau (born June 24, 1940) is a Canadian retired amateur and professional box lacrosse goaltender. A member of the Canadian Lacrosse Hall of Fame, Comeau was the winner of four Mann Cup national championships, WLA playoff and regular season most valuable player trophies, seven all-star team inductions and four Nicholson Trophies as the WLA's top goaltender.

Career
At age 12, Comeau switched from defenceman to goaltender. After four provincial minor championships, he was promoted to the Junior A New Westminster Salmonbellies. He helped lead the 'Bellies to the 1960 Minto Cup with a 21-1 record and an 0.810 save percentage in the regular season.

In 1962, Comeau was forced to split his time between the New Westminster Salmonbellies of the ICLL and Port Coquitlam of the Senior B loop. In Senior B, he led Port Coquitlam to a provincial title. By 1964, he was full-time with the Salmonbellies. He also played a stint with the Coquitlam Adanacs.

In 1968, Comeau turned professional with the relocated Portland Adanacs in the National Lacrosse Association, but rejoined the Salmonbellies for the 1969 NLA season. The 'Bellies would win the WLA Conference of the NLA, but lose the final to the Peterborough Lakers. The NLA folded at the end of the 1969 season.

In 1971, 1972, and 1973, Comeau was a WLA playoff champion and won the Mann Cup in 1971 and 1973. He subsequently retired from lacrosse. In 1974, he returned and won yet another league title and Mann Cup and retired again. Late in the 1976 season, his Salmonbellies were suffering a bad season, and he came out of retirement to turn their season around, win the league and a fourth Mann Cup. He then retired for a third and final time.

"Quiet Man" Comeau was elected into the Canadian Lacrosse Hall of Fame in 1983. The Salmonbellies dynasty that he was an integral part of was also inducted in 2004.

Statistics
''Source: Wamper's Bible of Lacrosse and Stan Shillington's "Who's Who in Lacrosse 1933-2013: Goaltending Records".

References 

Canadian lacrosse players
Lacrosse people from British Columbia
Sportspeople from Vancouver
1940 births
Living people